SHFV may refer to:

 Simian hemorrhagic fever virus.
 Schleswig-Holsteinischer Fussball-Verband, the Schleswig-Holstein Football Association, in Germany.